Joan Myers (born in Des Moines, Iowa, 1944) is a fine art photographer best known for her images of Antarctica and the American West. She has also photographed the Japanese Relocation Camp from the 1940s, the Spanish pilgrimage to Santiago de Compostela, India wildlife, women as they age, and the extremes of ice and fire such as glaciers and volcanoes. She currently lives in northern New Mexico.

Biography 
Myers earned a master's degree in musicology from Stanford University in 1967 with a concentration on Renaissance and baroque music performance. In the early 1970s she turned to photography.  She began as a large-format platinum-palladium printer and now shoots and prints digitally.

Her work has been exhibited in over 50 one-person shows and is in more than 30 public collections including: The Museum of Modern Art, George Eastman House, the National Gallery of Art (Smithsonian Institution), Amon Carter Museum, the University of New Mexico, the Museum of Fine Arts (Houston), the Museum of Photographic Art (San Diego), and the Center for Creative Photography (Tucson).

In 2002, the National Science Foundation awarded Joan Myers an Antarctic Artists and Writer's Grant to photograph at McMurdo Station, surrounding field stations, historic huts, and the South Pole during the 2002-2003 austral summer.

Books 

 Where the Buffalo Roamed  
 The Persephones   
 Fire and Ice   
 The Jungle at the Door   
 Wondrous Cold  
 Salt Dreams  
 Santiago: Saint of Two Worlds  
 Whispered Silences 
 Pie Town Woman  
 Along the Santa Fe Trail 
 The Essential Landscape

Awards 
1996  Golden Globe Award for Whispered Silences from the Maine Photographic Workshops
1997  Myers Center Award for the Study of Human Rights in North America for Whispered Silences
1999 Western States Arts Foundation Award for best creative non-fiction book to Salt Dreams
2000 William P. Clements Prize for the Best nonfiction Book on Southwestern America for Salt Dreams
2001 Best Illustrated Trade Book Award from the Publishers Association of the West for Pie Town Woman
2005  Wondrous Cold: An Antarctic Journey received an Honorable Mention from the American Association of Museums' 2006 Publications Competition

Selected solo exhibitions 
1976 Robert Schoelkopf Gallery, New York
1986-1989 Smithsonian Institution Traveling Exhibition Service (SITES) tour of "Santa Fe Trail Series" (including Nelson Atkins Museum of Art and the Akron Art Museum)
1992 Albuquerque Museum, Albuquerque (Traveling Show of "Santiago: Saint of Two Worlds")
1996–1999 Smithsonian Institution Traveling Exhibition Service (SITES) tour of "Whispered Silences" (including Japanese American National Museum, San Diego Museum of Photographic Art, and California State University  (Sacramento)
2001–2002 California Council for the Humanities tour of Salt Dreams
2002–2003 Albuquerque Museum show and tour of Pie Town Woman
2006–2010 Smithsonian Institution Traveling Exhibition Service (SITES) show of Wondrous Cold:  An Antarctic Journey (including Smithsonian Museum of Natural History)
2009–2010 Nevada Museum of Art, Reno (Wondrous Cold)
2014 New Mexico Museum of Art

References

External links 
Official site
Smithsonian American Art Museum

Photography awards
20th-century American women artists
Artists from New Mexico
United States National Science Foundation officials
1944 births
Living people
American women photographers
21st-century American women